The Free Democratic Movement (FDM) is the newest of the three political parties in Bermuda. It was founded by former Progressive Labour Party leader Marc Bean in September 2020 to contest the 2020 Bermudian general election on October 1, 2020. It fielded 14 candidates for the 36-seat legislature, winning no seats and placing second in 4 races, with 5% of the vote. The party has had no publicised activity since the 2020 election.

Policies
Bean identifies as a classical liberal.

The FDM's policies include:
 Individual rights
 Limited government
 Equality
 Subsidiarity
 Spontaneous order
 Property rights
 Honesty among citizens (aka 'The Golden Rule')

In the area of education, the FDM wants to downsize the Department of Education to improve efficiency, introduce a school voucher system as well as an independent system to monitor the performance of schools, and devolve control of what schools teach to educators.

Among other issues, the FDM wants to abolish taxes on sugar and dividends, and has stated its neutrality to same-sex marriage.

Since the 2020 election, the party has not updated its website or had any public discussions about its future.

Party leaders

Election results

References

External links
 Official website

Political parties in Bermuda
Liberal parties in British Overseas Territories
Liberal parties in North America
Political parties established in 2020
2020 establishments in Bermuda
Classical liberal parties